A Panther is a creature in ancient legend that resembles a big cat with a multicoloured hide. 

According to medieval beliefs, after feasting, the panther will sleep in a cave for a total of three days. After this period ends, the panther roars, in the process emitting a sweet smelling odor. This odor draws in any creatures who smell it (the dragon being the only creature immune); they are eaten by the panther, and the cycle begins again.

The ancient Greeks believed the panther was one of the favored mounts of the god Dionysus.

Other names for this creature are pantera, pantere, and love cervere.

Illustration

Usually depicted as a type of cat, the panther was at times depicted in other forms. It was depicted as a donkey, as a composite creature with a horned head, long neck and a horse's body, and as a host of other forms. (The word "panther", in Greek, could be interpreted as "every wild beast", supporting the idea of a composite creature.) This was mostly because those involved did not know what a panther should look like; but, in some instances, this was due to cultural influences. In Germany in particular, the panther is often depicted in heraldry as a creature with four horns, cow's ears and a fiery red tongue. An example of the former is the flag and coat of arms of the city of Cres, Croatia.

Heraldry

In heraldry the panther is commonly used in a form known as the panther incensed. In this form, the panther is depicted with flames coming from its mouth and ears, representing the panther's sweet odour.

The heraldic panther is usually shown with coloured spots (semée of roundels), which are frequently blue and red. The arms of the Worshipful Company of Dyers, however, have as supporters two panthers "incensed Gules crowned Or and semée of Roundels Gules, Azure, Vert, Purpure and Sable" (with red flames, a gold crown and red, blue, green, purple and black spots). These colours are also seen on the badge of the National Crime Agency, which features a panther as one of its supporters. The panther was used by Henry VI of England as his badge and by other members of the House of Lancaster. 

A panther which is all silver (argent) is seen in the coat of arms of the Austrian province of Styria (Steiermark) on green (Vert) shield.

See also

Jaguars in Mesoamerican cultures

Underwater panther
Werecat
Were-jaguar

References

External links

The use of the panther as a symbol in tattoo designs

Medieval European legendary creatures
Heraldic beasts
Mythological felines